The Sunda megathrust is a fault that extends approximately 5,500 km (3300 mi) from Myanmar (Burma) in the north, running along the southwestern side of Sumatra, to the south of Java and Bali before terminating near Australia. It is a megathrust, located at a convergent plate boundary where it forms the interface between the overriding Eurasian plate and the subducting Indo-Australian plate. It is one of the most seismogenic structures on Earth, being responsible for many great and giant earthquakes, including the 2004 Indian Ocean earthquake and tsunami that killed over 227,000 people. The Sunda megathrust can be divided into the Andaman Megathrust, Sumatra(n) Megathrust and Java(n) Megathrust. The Bali-Sumbawa segment is much less active and therefore does not have the "megathrust" term associated with it.

Tectonic setting 

The subducting plate consists of two protoplates, the Indian and Australian plates. Similarly, the overriding plate consists of two microplates, the Sunda and Burma plates. The relative motion of the subducting and overriding plates varies slightly along strike due to these complexities but is always strongly oblique. The strike-slip component of the oblique convergence is accommodated by displacement on the Great Sumatran fault, while the dip-slip component is taken up by the Sunda megathrust.

Megathrust geometry 
The Sunda megathrust is curviplanar, forming an arc in map view and, at least in Sumatra, increasing in dip from 5°-7° near the trench, then increasing gradually from 15°-20° beneath the Mentawai Islands to about 30° below the coastline of Sumatra.

Earthquakes 

At this plate boundary, earthquakes occur along the Sunda megathrust and within both the subducting and overriding plates. The largest earthquakes are generated when the megathrust itself ruptures. Studies of both recent and historical earthquakes show that the megathrust is segmented. The largest earthquakes occur on separate 'patches' along the megathrust surface (1797, 1833, 1861, 2004, 2005 & 2007), with smaller events occurring at the boundaries between these patches (1935, 1984, 2000 & 2002). The rupture area of the 1861 event appears to be very similar to that for the 2005 event, suggesting that it can be regarded as a repeat event. The 2007 event is interpreted to be a partial failure of the rupture area of the 1833 event.

The 2004 earthquake ruptured an enormous segment of the megathrust surface. Research into evidence for previous events of this size suggests that they are rare, with two candidate earlier events occurring soon after AD 1290–1400 and AD 780–990. The Java-Bali segment of the megathrust does not appear to be associated with great earthquakes, possibly due to mainly aseismic slip.

List of Sunda megathrust earthquakes 

This table lists Sunda Megathrust quakes with magnitudes of 7 or greater, or any known to have caused deaths.  Historic records before 2004 are incomplete.

References 

 Sunda megathrust
Seismic faults of Oceania
Seismic faults of Indonesia